Tomáš Hrubý (born 7 June 1982 in Vrchlabí) is a Czech former professional road cyclist.

References

External links

1982 births
Living people
Czech male cyclists
People from Vrchlabí
Sportspeople from the Hradec Králové Region